C. edulis may refer to:

 Canna edulis, the eatable species of the Canna genus
 Caralluma edulis, a succulent plant species
 Carissa edulis, the conkerberry or bush plum, a shrub species
 Carpobrotus edulis, a creeping, mat-forming succulent plant species
 Casimiroa edulis, the white sapote, custard apple and cochitzapotl in Nahuatl, a plant species
 Catha edulis, the khat, a flowering plant species
 Commiphora edulis, (Klotzsch) Engl., a plant species in the genus Commiphora
 Cordeauxia edulis, also known as the ye'eb, yeheb or jeheb nut, a tree species
 Coula edulis, a tree species native to tropical western Africa from Sierra Leone to Angola

See also
 Edulis (disambiguation)